Baş Qərvənd ( or ) is a village in the Agdam District of Azerbaijan.

References 
 
 Baş Qərvənd in official pronouncement

Populated places in Aghdam District